US Debt Ventures is a private equity firm based in Fort Lauderdale, Florida, and sponsored by a group of high net worth investors. The company focuses on acquisitions of distressed real estate, and provides an online platform for accredited investors to participate in crowdfunding.

In 2013, the company was projected to surpass $1 billion in total portfolio purchases.

History 
USDV's founder, Todd Billings, started out running a small wealth management company, Veriloquent Wealth Advisors. At the request of one of their investors, they began transitioning to the distressed real estate field in 2009. After putting $1 million into USDV and setting up a series of partnerships to purchase distressed real estate, Billings officially launched US Debt Ventures in 2010.

USDV currently offers a number of investment products, divided into four main asset classes: residential real estate, commercial real estate (CRE), performing loans, and strategy funds. Until Section III of the JOBS Act has been passed, the company is only targeting accredited investors.

References

External links 
US Debt Ventures Homepage

Financial services companies established in 2010
Companies based in Fort Lauderdale, Florida
Private equity firms of the United States
Real estate companies of the United States
2010 establishments in Florida